Esiküla is a village in Hiiumaa Parish, Hiiu County in northwestern Estonia. The village is located on Kassari Island.

The village is first mentioned in 1688 (Kassarske Förbyn ell. Eszekülla). Historically, the village was part of Kassari Manor.

In 1977, the villages Kiisi and Uidu were merged with Esiküla.

See also
 Taguküla

References
 

Villages in Hiiu County